Bennet C. Riley (November 27, 1787June 6, 1853) was the seventh and last military governor of California.  Riley ordered the election of representatives to a state constitutional convention, and handed over all civil authority to a Governor and elected delegates at the end of 1849; the following year, California joined the U.S. as a state. He participated in the War of 1812 on Lake Ontario. He also served in the United States Army during the Seminole War in Florida, and Mexican–American War.

Early life and family 
Riley was born to an Irish-Catholic couple, Bennet Riley and Susanna Ann Drury in St. Mary's, Maryland, 1787. His father apprenticed him to a cobbler; later, he served as a foreman in a shoe factory. After his father's death in 1811, he signed up for service on a privateer.

Riley married Arabella Israel, of Philadelphia, on 9 November 1834, at the Jefferson Barracks, Lemay, Missouri. They had eight children: William Davenport Riley and Samuel Israel Riley, twins, died in Fort King, Florida, on 15 and 17 November 1841; Bennet Israel Riley, born 1835 in Massachusetts, served in the Navy and died aboard the war-sloop , which disappeared with all hands in September, 1854; Mary, born 1836; Arabella I. Riley, 1837–1916) (never married); George, born 1838; and Edward Bishop Dudley Riley (1839–1918), whose military career was split between the Union and Confederate armies.

Ulysses S. Grant described Bennet Riley as "the finest specimen of physical manhood I had ever looked upon...6'2 (190 cm) in his stocking feet, straight as the undrawn [sic] bowstring, broad shouldered with every limb in perfect proportion, with an eagle and a step as light as a forest tiger." An accident or injury in his youth caused him to lose part of his palate, and he spoke with a hoarse voice.

Military career in the War of 1812
Riley volunteered for service in the War of 1812, and on 19 January 1813, he was appointed Ensign of Rifles. In March of the same year, he became a third lieutenant and in April 1814 a second lieutenant in the First Rifles. He saw action at Sackets Harbor, New York, in second of two battles for control of the shipyards on Lake Ontario. He gained a promotion to first lieutenant in March 1817. Riley was further advanced to captain in the 5th U.S. Infantry, and by 1821 he was transferred to the 6th U.S. Infantry.

Skirmish near the garrison of Ogdensburg
Benjamin Forsyth needed firewood for his barracks. Forsyth sent Bennet C. Riley with about a half dozen riflemen upriver to gather some wood in a boat. Riley and his men tried to stay by their side as close as possible and as stealthily as possible. But a group of British gunboats spotted Riley's boat crea and set upon them. Benjamin Forsyth and his riflemen rowed out on their boat providing sniper covering fire for Riley's crew. The British gunboats were held at bay as Riley and Forsyth both withdrew safely back to their fort in their boats.

Spearheading and raiding York
Benjamin Forsyth and Bennet C. Riley spearheaded a raid in York. It would be a massive large force of 1,700 regulars including riflemen in 14 armed vessels. Forsyth and Riley led the way with their riflemen at the front to make a beachhead. Forsyth, Riley, and the riflemen landed at the beach. The Americans engaged the British regulars, Indians, and Candians who were trying to set up a defense. Forsyth, Riley, and their riflemen hid behind trees and logs and never exposed themselves except when they fired, squatting down to load their pieces, and their clothes being green they were well camouflaged with the bushes and trees. The place chosen by the Americans for landing was very advantageous for their troops, being full of shrubs and bushes. The Americans immediately covered and cut off the British-allied forces, with little or no danger to the Americans. The British and their allies, suffering many casualties, withdrew from the field. The Americans suffered moderate casualties from resistance from British-allied remnants, magazine explosion, or other circumstances. The American raid at York was successful, however it was not without some controversy. Even though the civilians were not harmed. Many of their belongings were looted by the Americans and many private property were burned to the ground. Despite that the American commander Pike who was killed in this raid explicitly instructed his soldiers not to conduct any looting or burning private property. The Americans, after conducting their raid, withdrew from York. Forsyth, Riley, and the rest of their riflemen also withdrew.

Capturing and interrogating prisoners
Bennet C. Riley was out patrolling with his other riflemen who were acting as sentries. Riley, Forsyth, and their riflemen were performing paramilitary operations in British Canada in support of America's invasion. Riley's fellow sentries captured 2 Canadian teenage boys who were acting as spies. Riley brought them before Forsyth. Forsythe and Riley did not wish to kill these teenage spies as they were just young boys. They had no intention of killing young teenage boys. So Forsyth and Riley bluffed the teenage spies into talking by pretending to threaten them with death. The ruse seemed so convincing that the teenage boys told Forsyth all valuable intelligence about a blockhouse that was being built to contest the American advance.  Then Forsyth and Riley released both teenage spies. Forsyth sent Riley to inform the American generals of the blockhouse. After Riley informed the American generals of the blockhouse, the American army easily overtook the blockhouse and routed the British-Canadian defenders.

Spearheading and besieging the British blockhouse Lacolle Mills
Benjamin Forsyth, Bennet C. Riley, and their riflemen spearheaded an attack on British-allied forces who were retreating back to a blockhouse. The main American army followed behind. The British and their allies fell back into their blockhouse. The British and their allies were deeply entrenched and fortified in their blockhouse. Riley, Forsyth, their riflemen, and the American army besieged the blockhouse with rifle/musket fire and artillery. But the British held them off to great effect. After a long siege, the American force withdrew.

Long-Range Patrol

Benjamin Forsyth, Bennet C. Riley, and 70 of their riflemen went out from their base from Chamberlain to patrol near the Canadian border. While the Americans were patrolling in a loose skirmishing V formation. Forsyth stopped his men and had a secret conversation with Riley. Forsyth whispered to Riley that he sensed that there were Indians and Canadians hiding in ambush. Forsyth commanded Riley to tell the rest of the riflemen to casually withdraw so as not to cause the Indians and Canadians to be eager to launch their ambush. Riley suggested to Forsyth that they should withdraw to a tavern on the outskirts of this town and take shelter in it. Riley explained that they could conduct sniper fire from within the cover of the tavern. While Riley and Forsyth were marching their column casually for ten minutes. The Canadian-Indian force caught up and opened fire. All 70 American riflemen opened a simultaneous volley fire killing or wounding many Canadians and Indians. The Americans retreated by leapfrogging. One group of riflemen would provide covering fire while one group of riflemen retreated. The American repeated this process until they reached the tavern. Riley, Forsyth, and all their riflemen went inside the tavern. The Americans sniped at the enemy from behind covered and concealed positions within the tavern. The Americans killed or wounded many Canadians and Indians. After this intense engagement, the enemy fully retreated. The Americans were victorious. One American rifleman was killed and some wounded. The Americans later withdrew back to American lines in Chamberlain.

Ambushing and killing an enemy leader
On August 10, 1814, Bennet C. Riley and a dozen American riflemen would conduct a mission behind enemy lines to kill or capture an enemy Canadian Indian tribal partisan leader named Captain Joseph St Valier Mailloux. Riley and his dozen riflemen infiltrated Odeltown in Canada silently. There was an enemy sentry. One of the American riflemen crept on the sentry and silently killed him with his tomahawk. Riley and his men hid the dead sentry's body. One of the American riflemen put on the dead sentry's uniform to trick captain Mailloux into a false sense of security when he came in to check on the sentry. The American rifleman disguised as the sentry stood guard while Riley and his other riflemen concealed themselves behind the bushes. Captain Mailloux came by and came closer to the sentry imposter to check up on him. Then Riley and his riflemen rose out of their concealment and demanded captain Mailloux to surrender. Captain Mailloux ran away. Riley's riflemen fired eleven shots hitting Mailloux eleven times. Mailloux was badly wounded. Riley and his riflemen carried Mailloux back to American lines in Chamberlain. The Americans tried to nurse Mailloux back to health, but Mailloux succumbed to his wounds and passed away.

Military Operations against the Arikara Indians
The officer joined his superior, Colonel Henry Leavenworth, in an engagement against the Arikara Indians in August 1823. Riley was honored for ten years of faithful service by being promoted to brevet major on 6 August 1828, leading the first military escort along the Santa Fe Trail in 1829.

Seminole Wars
He had tenures as major in the 4th U.S. Infantry (1837) and lieutenant colonel, 2nd U.S. Infantry, beginning in December 1839. The Battle of Chokachotta in Florida took place on 2 June 1840. Colonel Riley was cited for bravery and good conduct during this engagement in the Seminole Wars. He gained the rank of Brevet Colonel in February 1844.

Mexican-American War
During the Mexican–American War, as colonel of the 2nd U.S. Infantry, Riley fought at the Siege of Veracruz and the Battle of Cerro Gordo, where he was cited for bravery. He was brevetted brigadier general and assumed command of the 2nd Brigade in David E. Twiggs's Second Division. He led his brigade at the Battle of Contreras and the Battle of Churubusco, where Winfield Scott gave him credit for the U.S. victory: Riley had discovered a way around the rear of Velencia's position. He was appointed brevet major general and fought at the Chapultepec. After the battle at Churubusco, he also presided over the courts-martial of 72 deserters of the so-called Saint Patrick's Battalion discovered hiding in the San Patricios convent; among them were John Murphy and John Riley. He was generally considered one of the ablest brigade commanders in the army during the war with Mexico.

Role in California statehood
After the war with Mexico, Riley served a brief stint at Fort Hamilton, in Brooklyn, New York, in 1848. In the years 1849 and 1850, General Riley commanded the Military Department in Upper California and exercised the duties of Provincial Governor: the inaction of Congress in deciding the issue of California statehood complicated his service. He relieved Colonel Richard B. Mason on 13 April 1849, as the Gold Rush worked into its most violent phase. In addition to the influx of prospectors seeking their fortunes, daily desertions of his own men rapidly depleted his troops. At the height of the Gold Rush, he had eight companies of infantry, two artillery, and two dragoons stretched between San Diego and San Francisco. When Congress refused to act on the statehood of California and New Mexico, he called for the election of civil officers to a de facto government. Consequently, the military authorities could not prevent the slaughter of California's native population, nor could they suppress the violence in the lawless gold camps. He relinquished all his civil power on 20 December 1849.

After his administrative service concluded on the Pacific, Riley was ordered to take command of a regiment on the Rio Grande. However ill-health prevented further service on his part. He returned to his home in Black Rock, near Buffalo, New York, where he died of cancer. General Riley died on Thursday evening, 10 June 1853, survived by his wife Arabella (who died on 12 February 1894) and four children. Riley is buried at Forest Lawn Cemetery, Buffalo.

Legacy
On 27 June 1853, Camp Center (Kansas Territory) was named Fort Riley in Bennet Riley's honor, even though he never served at the fort, and it was a cavalry post, while Riley's career was that of an infantryman. Riley County, Kansas is also named in his honor.

Notes and citations

Notes

Citations

External links
 New York Times: "General Riley", June 11, 1853, obituary
 Guide to the Bennet Riley Papers at The Bancroft Library
 Short bios of all California military governors

United States military governors of California
American military personnel of the Mexican–American War
American people of the Seminole Wars
United States Army colonels
1790 births
1853 deaths
People from St. Mary's County, Maryland
Military personnel from Maryland
Burials at Forest Lawn Cemetery (Buffalo)
Deaths from cancer in New York (state)
19th-century American politicians